Wild Hog in the Red Brush is an old-time music album by John Hartford, released in 1996.

Reception

Writing for AllMusic, critic Rick Anderson wrote "The whole thing's a hoot and a joy, and is recommended strongly."

Track listing
 "Squirrel Hunters" (Samuel Bayard) – 2:28
 "Birdie" (Elmer Bird) – 2:25
 "Grandmammy Look at Uncle Sam" (Forrester) – 3:06
 "Old Virginia Reel" (Amyx Stamper) – 2:41
 "Flannery's Dream" (Ricky Skaggs) – 3:41
 "Down at the Mouth of Old Stinson" (Wilson Douglas) – 1:58
 "The Girl With the Blue Dress On" (Bayard) – 2:33
 "Wild Hog in the Red Brush" (Stamper) – 2:40
 "Over the Road to Maysville" (J. P. Fraley) – 4:13
 "Bumblebee in a Jug" (John Harrod, Geo Lee Hawkins) – 2:26
 "Bostony" (Morris Allen, Harrod) – 2:40
 "Shelvin' Rock" (Solly Carpenter) – 3:26
 "Molly Put the Kettle On" (Brad Leftwich) – 1:56
 "West Fork Gals" (Douglas) – 2:36
 "Portsmouth Airs" (John Lozier) – 2:23
 "Coquette" (John Hartford) – 2:09
 "Jimmy in the Swamp" (R. P. Christenson) – 2:41
 "Lady of the Lake" (Bayard) – 2:54
 "Natchez Under the Hill" (Benny Thomasson) – 2:42

Personnel
John Hartford – fiddle
Bob Carlin – banjo
Jerry McCoury – bass
Ronnie McCoury – guitar
Mike Compton – mandolin
Production notes:
Bob Carlin – producer, mastering
John Hartford – producer, liner notes, art direction
Mark Howard – engineer
Hank Tilbury – engineer
David Glasser – mastering
Luanne Price Howard – art direction

References

John Hartford albums
1996 albums